New Glarus Woods State Park is a  Wisconsin state park featuring rolling hills covered by a mix of forest and prairie.  The Sugar River State Trail connects to the park, making the park accessible by bike.  This trail also connects to the Badger State Trail.

External links
New Glarus Woods State Park official site

Protected areas of Green County, Wisconsin
State parks of Wisconsin
Protected areas established in 1934
1934 establishments in Wisconsin